Political leaders of the US and UK, which led the arguments leading to the invasion, have claimed that the war was legal; however, legal experts, including John Chilcot, who, acting as chairman for the British public inquiry into Iraq, also known as the Iraq Inquiry, led an investigation with hearings from November 24th, 2009, to February 2nd, 2011, concluded that the process of identifying the legal basis for the invasion of Iraq was unsatisfactory and that the actions of the US and the UK have undermined the authority of the United Nations.
Russian President Vladimir Putin stated that the war was unjustified and Deputy Prime Minister to Tony Blair, John Prescott, has also argued that the invasion of Iraq lacked legality as examples. In a 2005 paper, Kramer & Michalowski argued that the war "violated the UN Charter and international humanitarian law". Russian President Vladimir Putin, in a televised conference before a meeting with the US envoy to Iraq, said on 19 December 2003 that "The use of force abroad, according to existing international laws, can only be sanctioned by the United Nations. This is the international law. Everything that is done without the UN Security Council's sanction cannot be recognised as fair or justified."

In September 2004, then-United Nations Secretary-General Kofi Annan stated, "I have indicated that it is not in accordance with the UN charter. From our point of view and the UN Charter point of view, it [the war] was illegal".

US and UK officials have argued that existing UN Security Council resolutions related to the 1991 Gulf War and the subsequent ceasefire (660, 678), and to later inspections of Iraqi weapons programs (1441), had already authorized the invasion. Critics of the invasion have challenged both of these assertions, arguing that an additional Security Council resolution, which the US and UK failed to obtain, would have been necessary to specifically authorize the invasion.

The UN Security Council, as outlined in Article 39 of the UN Charter, has the ability to rule on the legality of the war, but has yet not been asked by any UN member nation to do so. The United States and the United Kingdom have veto power in the Security Council, so action by the Security Council is highly improbable even if the issue were to be raised. Despite this, the UN General Assembly (UNGA) may ask that the International Court of Justice (ICJ)—"the principal judicial organ of the United Nations" (Article 92)—give either an 'advisory opinion' or 'judgement' on the legality of the war.

International law

International Court of Justice
The International Court of Justice is the principal judicial organ of the United Nations. The General Assembly or the Security Council may request that the International Court of Justice provide an advisory opinion on any legal question. Any organ or agency of the UN so authorized by the General Assembly may also request the ICJ for an advisory opinion.

Principal legal rationales
The United Nations Charter is the foundation of modern international law. The UN Charter is a treaty ratified by the US and its principal coalition allies in the 2003 invasion of Iraq, which are therefore legally bound by its terms. Article 2(4) of the UN Charter generally bans the use of force by states except when carefully circumscribed conditions are met, stating:

All members shall refrain in their international relations from the threat or use of force against the territorial integrity or political independence of any state, or in any other manner inconsistent with the purposes of the United Nations.

This rule was "enshrined in the United Nations Charter in 1945 for a good reason: to prevent states from using force as they felt so inclined", said Louise Doswald-Beck, Secretary-General International Commission of Jurists.

Therefore, in the absence of an armed attack against the US or the coalition members, any legal use of force, or any legal threat of the use of force, had to be supported by a UN Security Council resolution authorizing member states to use force against Iraq. However, the US government stated that an armed attack by Iraq did occur against the US and its coalition partners, as demonstrated by the assassination attempt on former US President George H. W. Bush in 1993 and the firing on coalition aircraft enforcing the no-fly zones over Northern and Southern Iraq since the 1991 Gulf War ceasefire agreement. Under Article 51 of the UN Charter, the US reserved the right to self-defense, even without a UN mandate, as were the cases in the bombing of Iraq in June 1993 in retaliation for Hussein's attempt on former President Bush's life and again in 1996 in retaliation for Hussein's targeting of American aircraft patrolling the no-fly zones over Northern and Southern Iraq and the launching of a major offensive against the city of Irbil in Iraqi Kurdistan in violation of UNSC Resolution 688 prohibiting repression of Iraq's ethnic minorities.

The US and UK governments, along with others, also stated (as detailed in the first four paragraphs of the joint resolution) that the invasion was entirely legal because it was already authorized by existing United Nations Security Council resolutions and a resumption of previously temporarily suspended hostilities, rather than a war of aggression, as the US and UK were acting as agents for Kuwait's defence in response to Iraq's 1990 invasion. Some International legal experts, including the International Commission of Jurists, the U.S.-based National Lawyers' Guild, a group of 31 Canadian law professors, and the U.S.-based Lawyers' Committee on Nuclear Policy, have found this legal rationale to be untenable, and are of the view that the invasion was not supported by UN resolution and was therefore illegal.

UN resolutions

Resolution 1441
UNSC Resolution 1441 was passed unanimously on November 8, 2002, to give Iraq "a final opportunity to comply with its disarmament obligations" that had been set out in several previous resolutions (resolution 660, resolution 661, resolution 678, resolution 686, resolution 687, resolution 688, resolution 707, resolution 715, resolution 986, and resolution 1284). According to the US State Department, "The resolution strengthened the mandate of the UN Monitoring and Verification Commission (UNMOVIC) and the International Atomic Energy Agency (IAEA), giving them authority to go anywhere, at any time and talk to anyone in order to verify Iraq's disarmament."

The most important text of Resolution 1441 was to require that Iraq "shall provide UNMOVIC and the IAEA immediate, unimpeded, unconditional, and unrestricted access to any and all, including underground, areas, facilities, buildings, equipment, records, and means of transport which they wish to inspect". However, on January 27, 2003, Hans Blix, the lead member of the UNMOVIC, said that, "Iraq appears not to have come to a genuine acceptance, not even today, of the disarmament that was demanded of it". Blix noted that Iraq had failed to cooperate in a number of areas, including the failure to provide safety to U-2 spy planes that inspectors hoped to use for aerial surveillance, refusal to let UN inspectors into several chemical, biological, and missile sites on the belief that they were engaging in espionage rather than disarmament, submitting 12,000-page arms declaration that it handed over in December 2002, which contained little more than old material previously submitted to inspectors, and failure to produce convincing evidence to the UN inspectors that it had unilaterally destroyed its anthrax stockpiles as required by resolution 687 a decade before 1441 was passed in 2002. On March 7, 2003, Blix said that Iraq had made significant progress toward resolving open issues of disarmament but the cooperation was still not "immediate" and "unconditional" as called for by UN Security Council Resolution 1441. He concluded that it would take "but months" to resolve the key remaining disarmament tasks. The US government observed this as a breach of resolution 1441 because Iraq did not meet the requirement of "immediate" and "unconditional" compliance.

On the day Resolution 1441 was passed, the US ambassador to the UN, John Negroponte, assured the Security Council that there were no "hidden triggers" with respect to the use of force, and that in the event of a "further breach" by Iraq, resolution 1441 would require that "the matter will return to the Council for discussions as required in paragraph 12." However, he then added: "If the Security Council fails to act decisively in the event of further Iraqi violations, this resolution does not constrain any Member State from acting to defend itself against the threat posed by Iraq or to enforce relevant United Nations resolutions and protect world peace and security."

At the same meeting, UK Permanent Representative Sir Jeremy Greenstock KCMG used many of the same words. "If there is a further Iraqi breach of its disarmament obligations, the matter will return to the Council for discussion as required in Operational Paragraph 12."

On March 17, 2003, the Attorney General for England and Wales Lord Goldsmith agreed that the use of force against Iraq was justified by resolution 1441, in combination with the earlier resolutions 678 and 687.

According to an independent commission of inquiry set up by the government of the Netherlands, UN resolution 1441 "cannot reasonably be interpreted as authorising individual member states to use military force to compel Iraq to comply with the Security Council's resolutions."

Resolutions related to First Persian Gulf War and also the 2003 invasion
As part of the 1991 Gulf War ceasefire agreement, the Iraqi government agreed to UN Security Council Resolution 687, which called for weapons inspectors to search locations in Iraq for chemical, biological, and nuclear weapons, as well as weapons that exceeded an effective distance of 150 kilometres. After the passing of resolution 687, thirteen additional resolutions (699, 707, 715, 949, 1051, 1060, 1115, 1134, 1137, 1154, 1194, 1205, 1284) were passed by the Security Council reaffirming the continuation of inspections, or citing Iraq's failure to comply fully with them. On September 9, 1998, the Security Council passed Resolution 1194, which unanimously condemned Iraq's suspension of cooperation with UNSCOM. One month later, on October 31, Iraq officially declares that it will cease all forms of interaction with UNSCOM.

United Nations Security Council Resolution 678 (1990) allows the use of any means necessary to enforce United Nations Security Council Resolution 660 (1990) and subsequent relevant resolutions and to force Iraq to stop certain activities that threaten international peace and security, such as making weapons of mass destruction and refusing or obstructing United Nations weapons inspections in violation of United Nations Security Council Resolution 68.

The commission of inquiry of the government of the Netherlands found that the UN resolution of the 1990s provided no authority for the invasion.

Criticisms

The legal right to determine how to enforce its own resolutions lies with the Security Council alone (UN Charter Articles 39–42), not with individual nations. On November 8th, 2002, immediately after the adoption of Security Council resolution 1441, Russia, the People's Republic of China, and France issued a joint statement declaring that Council Resolution 1441 did not authorize any "automaticity" in the use of force against Iraq, and that a further Council resolution was needed were force to be used. Critics have also pointed out that the statements of US officials leading up to the war indicated their belief that a new Security Council resolution was required to make an invasion legal, but the UN Security Council has not made such a determination, despite serious debate over this issue. To secure Syria's vote in favor of Council Resolution 1441, Secretary of State Powell reportedly advised Syrian officials that "there is nothing in the resolution to allow it to be used as a pretext to launch a war on Iraq."

The United States structured its reports to the United Nations Security Council around intelligence from the Central Intelligence Agency and Secret Intelligence Service (MI6) stating that Iraq possessed weapons of mass destruction. The US claimed that justification for the war rested upon Iraq's violation of several UN resolutions, most recently UN Security Council Resolution 1441.

Commission of Inquiry of the Dutch Government
According to a detailed legal investigation conducted by an independent commission of inquiry set up by the government of the Netherlands headed by former Netherlands Supreme Court president Willibrord Davids, the 2003 invasion violated international law. Also, the commission concluded that the notion of "regime change" as practiced by the powers that invaded Iraq had "no basis in international law". Also, the commission found that UN resolution 1441 "cannot reasonably be interpreted as authorising individual member states to use military force to compel Iraq to comply with the Security Council's resolutions". In a letter to the parliament, the Dutch cabinet admitted that MPs could have been better informed about the doubts and uncertainties of the Dutch intelligence services and about the United States' request for Dutch support.

The Davids inquiry also investigated the rumours that the appointment of former Dutch foreign minister De Hoop Scheffer as NATO secretary general was the result of his support for the US-led invasion of Iraq, but was unable to find any proof. In February 2010 De Hoop Scheffer himself criticised the Davids Commission report. In an interview with newspaper de Volkskrant he argued that the cabinet did fully inform parliament and that there had never been any doubts. He rejected the conclusion that it took less than 45 minutes to decide to give political support to the United States. He also contested the conclusion that Prime Minister Balkenende failed to provide adequate leadership. In addition, he argued that no United Nations mandate was needed for the invasion of Iraq and remarked that there was no UN mandate when the Netherlands supported the 1991 US operations in Iraq.

Doubts in the British government
Then UK Foreign Secretary Jack Straw sent a secret letter to Prime Minister Tony Blair in April 2002 warning Blair that the case for military action against Iraq was of "dubious legality". The letter goes on to state that "regime change per se is no justification for military action" and that "the weight of legal advice here is that a fresh [UN] mandate may well be required." Such a new UN mandate was never given. The letter also expresses doubts regarding the outcome of military action.

In March 2003, Elizabeth Wilmshurst, then deputy legal adviser to the British Foreign Office, resigned in protest of Britain's decision to invade without Security Council authorization. Wilmshurst also insinuated that the English Attorney General Lord Goldsmith also believed the war was illegal, but changed his opinion several weeks before the invasion.

In March 2004, when a Royal Court trial raised the question of whether the invasion was legal, the under-secretary of state Sir Michael Hastings wrote to the court, warning "it would be prejudicial to the national interest and to the conduct of the Government’s foreign policy if the English courts were to express opinions on questions of international law".

In 2010, then-deputy prime minister of a later government, Nick Clegg, during prime minister's questions in Parliament, asserted that the Iraq war was illegal.  Statements issued later suggested that this was a personal view and not a formal view of the coalition government.

In 2016, the deputy prime minister at the time of the invasion, John Prescott, wrote: "In 2004, the UN Secretary-General Kofi Annan said that as regime change was the prime aim of the Iraq War, it was illegal.  With great sadness and anger, I now believe him to be right."

War of aggression
The International Military Tribunal at Nuremberg held following World War II that the waging of a war of aggression is:

Benjamin B. Ferencz was one of the chief prosecutors for the United States at the military trials of German officials following World War II, and a former law professor. In an interview given on August 25, 2006, Ferencz stated that not only Saddam Hussein should be tried, but also George W. Bush because the Iraq War had been begun by the U.S. without permission by the UN Security Council.  Benjamin B. Ferencz wrote the foreword for Michael Haas's book, George W. Bush, War Criminal?: The Bush Administration's Liability for 269 War Crimes.  Ferencz elaborated as follows:

Professor Ferencz quoted the British deputy legal adviser to the Foreign Ministry who resigned suddenly before the Iraq war started, stating in her resignation letter: 

The invasion of Iraq was neither in self-defense against armed attack nor sanctioned by UN Security Council resolution authorizing the use of force by member states and thus constituted the crime of war of aggression, according to the International Commission of Jurists (ICJ) in Geneva. A "war waged without a clear mandate from the United Nations Security Council would constitute a flagrant violation of the prohibition of the use of force". We note with "deep dismay that a small number of states are poised to launch an outright illegal invasion of Iraq, which amounts to a war of aggression".

Then Iraq Ambassador to the United Nations Mohammed Aldouri shared the view that the invasion was a violation of international law and constituted a war of aggression, as did a number of American legal experts, including Marjorie Cohn, Professor at Thomas Jefferson School of Law and president of the National Lawyers Guild and former Attorney-General of the United States Ramsey Clark.

Domestic law

United States

With the support of large bipartisan majorities, the U.S. Congress passed the Authorization for Use of Military Force Against Iraq Resolution of 2002.  The resolution asserts the authorization by the Constitution of the United States and the United States Congress for the President to fight anti-United States terrorism. Citing the Iraq Liberation Act of 1998, the resolution reiterated that it should be the policy of the United States to remove the Saddam Hussein regime and promote a democratic replacement.  The resolution "supported" and "encouraged" diplomatic efforts by President George W. Bush to "strictly enforce through the U.N. Security Council all relevant Security Council resolutions regarding Iraq" and "obtain prompt and decisive action by the Security Council to ensure that Iraq abandons its strategy of delay, evasion, and noncompliance and promptly and strictly complies with all relevant Security Council resolutions regarding Iraq". The resolution authorized President Bush to use the Armed Forces of the United States "as he determines to be necessary and appropriate" in order to "defend the national security of the United States against the continuing threat posed by Iraq; and enforce all relevant UN Security Council Resolutions regarding Iraq".

United Kingdom

Opinion of the Attorney General for England and Wales 

Before the invasion, the then Attorney General for England and Wales Lord Goldsmith, advised that the war would be in breach of international law for six reasons, ranging from the lack of a second United Nations resolution to UN inspector Hans Blix's continuing search for weapons. Ten days later, on March 7, 2003, as UK troops were massing in Kuwait, Lord Goldsmith changed his mind, saying:

I remain of the opinion that the safest legal course would be to secure the adoption of a further resolution to authorise the use of force.... Nevertheless, having regard to the information on the negotiating history which I have been given and to the arguments of the US Administration which I heard in Washington, I accept that a reasonable case can be made that resolution 1441 is capable in principle of reviving the authorisation in 678 without a further resolution.

He concluded his revised analysis by saying that "regime change cannot be the objective of military action."

Downing Street memo

On 1 May 2005, a related UK document known as the Downing Street memo, detailing the minutes of a meeting on 26 July 2002, was apparently leaked to The Sunday Times. The memo recorded the head of the Secret Intelligence Service (MI6) as expressing the view following his recent visit to Washington that "Bush wanted to remove Saddam, through military action, justified by the conjunction of terrorism and WMD. But the intelligence and facts were being fixed around the policy." It also quoted Secretary of State for Foreign and Commonwealth Affairs (Foreign Secretary) Jack Straw as saying that it was clear that Bush had "made up his mind" to take military action but that "the case was thin", and the Attorney-General Goldsmith as warning that justifying the invasion on legal grounds would be difficult.

British officials did not dispute the document's authenticity but did dispute that it accurately stated the situation. The Downing Street memo is relevant to the question of whether or not the invasion of Iraq in 2003 was legal because it talks about some legal ideas that were thought about before the invasion.

Cabinet meeting minutes
The minutes of the cabinet meetings where the legality of the Iraq war was discussed was subjected to a Freedom of Information request in 2007.  The request was refused.  On 19 February 2008 the Information Commissioner ordered the minutes to be disclosed in the public interest  but the government appealed to the Information Tribunal.  When the Tribunal upheld the order for disclosure in early 2009  Jack Straw (then Justice Minister) issued the first ever ministerial veto (Section 53 of the Freedom of Information Act 2000) and prevented the release of the minutes. On 6 July 2016, extracts from the minutes were disclosed by the Iraq Inquiry.

Germany

On June 21, 2005, the German Federal Administrative Court found with regard to the Iraq War that it had "grave concerns in terms of public international law." The Court did not make it clear that, in its opinion, the war and the contributions to it by the German Federal Government were outright illegal.

In this minor criminal case the court decided not to convict a Major in the German Army of the crime of refusing duty that would advance the Iraq war. Nikolaus Schultz wrote of this decision: "The Court did not express an opinion as to whether the war on Iraq constituted an act of aggression in the first part of its judgement when dealing with the exceptions to the obligation of a German member of the Federal Armed Forces to obey orders. At a later stage in the written reasons, however, it jumped to the conclusion that a state that resorts to military force without justification and, therefore, violates the prohibition of the use of force provided for by Art. 2.4 of the Charter, at the same time commits an act of military aggression. The (non-binding) Definition of Aggression of the GA attached to UN General Assembly Resolution 3314 is broad enough to support this conclusion. However, it has to be recalled that the State Parties to the Rome Statute of the International Criminal Court (ICC) could not agree on a definition of the crime of aggression."

Nikolaus Schultz wrote in summary of this case: "These findings were watered down to an extent by the Court when it used the cautious proviso that the actions of the states involved only gave rise to grave concerns before arguing the respective issues at stake. By doing that, the Court shifted the burden to the individual soldiers and their decision of conscience whether to obey an order rather than reaching the conclusion that participating in a war violating rules of international law, and even constituting an act of aggression, as the court held, would be illegal and, therefore, justify insubordination."

Netherlands
Following intelligence from the UK and US, the Dutch government supported the operation of the multinational force in 2003. In January 2010, in the Netherlands, the 10-month Davids Commission inquiry published its final report. The Commission had been tasked with investigating Dutch government decision-making on political support for the war in Iraq in 2003 . The inquiry by the Dutch commission was the first ever independent legal assessment of the invasion decision. The Dutch commissioners included the former president of the Supreme Court, a former judge of the European Court of Justice, and two academic lawyers.

According to the report, the Dutch cabinet failed to fully inform the House of Representatives that the allies' military action against Iraq "had no sound mandate under international law" and that the United Kingdom was instrumental in influencing the Dutch decision to back the war. It also emerged that the British government had refused to disclose a key document requested by the Dutch panel, a letter to Balkenende from Tony Blair, asking for the support. This letter was said to have been handed over in a "breach of diplomatic protocol" and therefore for Balkenende's eyes only.

In response, Balkenende stated that he had fully informed the House of Representatives about government support for the invasion, and that Saddam Hussein's repeated refusal to respect UN resolutions and cooperate with UN weapons inspectors had justified the invasion.

See also
Command responsibility
Criticism of the Iraq War
Human Rights Record of the United States
Human rights in post-invasion Iraq
International Criminal Court and the 2003 invasion of Iraq
Iraq War misappropriations
Laws of war
Legitimacy of the 2003 invasion of Iraq
List of United Nations Security Council resolutions concerning Iraq
List of Iraq War resisters
Opposition to the Iraq War
Protests against the Iraq War
Public relations preparations for 2003 invasion of Iraq
Rationale for the Iraq War
United Nations Security Council and the Iraq War
United States and the International Criminal Court
Views on the 2003 invasion of Iraq
Hussein Kamel al-Majid
 Legality of the 2022 Russian invasion of Ukraine

Notes

Legality of wars
Iraq War
Iraq War legal issues